(born 27 May 2000) is a Japanese professional golfer. After playing on the LPGA of Japan Tour where she has eight wins, she currently plays on the LPGA Tour. She won her first LPGA Tour championship on 31 July 2022, at the Trust Golf Women's Scottish Open.

Early life and amateur career
Furue was born in Kobe and started playing golf at the age of 3, coached by her father. She has also been a swimmer since the age of four in parallel with golf.

Furue won the Kansai Elementary School Golf Championship in 2012, and the Kansai Junior High School Golf Championship in 2014 and 2015, and while attending Kobe Municipal Nagata Junior High School she won the National Junior High School Golf Championship in 2015 and the Kansai High School Golf Championship in 2016. She participated in the 2016 Japan Women's Open Golf Championship where she made the cut and finished tied for 28th place.

She played for the Japan National Team in 2017 and 2018. She won the 2018 Junior Golf World Cup with the team and finished 4th individually. She was also 4th individually at the 2018 Asian Games, where the Japan team finished 5th.

Furue won the 2019 Fujitsu Ladies on the LPGA of Japan Tour as an amateur, and turned professional shortly afterwards.

Professional career
Furue recorded three victories and two runner-up finishes on the LPGA of Japan Tour in 2020. She shot up to No. 42 in the Women's World Golf Rankings to secure a spot at the 2020 U.S. Women's Open, where she did not make the cut. 

In 2021, she won a further three tournaments and rose to No. 14 in the world rankings. She was in contention at the 2021 Evian Championship where she birdied three of the last four holes to claim fourth ahead of Atthaya Thitikul. 

At the 2021 Women's British Open, Furue started the final round four shots behind co-leaders Anna Nordqvist and Nanna Koerstz Madsen, but lost ground on the leaders and ended tied for 20th as she carded a level-par round of 72 that featured an eagle, two birdies and four bogeys.

Furue earned her card for the 2022 LPGA Tour through qualifying school.

She won her first LPGA Tour tournament, at the Trust Golf Women's Scottish Open on 31 July 2022, shooting a course record 10-under-par 62 (267, −21) in the final round to win by three strokes over Céline Boutier, after trailing by four strokes after 54 holes to co-leaders Boutier and Lydia Ko.

Amateur wins
2012 Kansai Elementary School Golf Championship
2014 Kansai Junior High School Golf Championship
2015 Kansai Junior High School Golf Championship, National Junior High School Golf Championship
2016 Kansai High School Golf Championship
2018 Kansai Women's Amateur Championship

Professional wins (9)

LPGA Tour wins (1)

Co-sanctioned by the Ladies European Tour.

LPGA of Japan Tour wins (8)

Ayaka won the 2019 Fujitsu Ladies as an amateur.

Results in LPGA majors

CUT = missed the half-way cut
NT = no tournament
T = tied

Summary

LPGA Tour career summary

^ official as of 31 July 2022  
*Includes matchplay and other tournaments without a cut.

World ranking
Position in Women's World Golf Rankings at the end of each calendar year.

^ as of 6 March 2023

Team appearances
Amateur
Neighbors Trophy Team Championship (representing Japan): 2017
Queen Sirikit Cup (representing Japan): 2017, 2018
Junior Golf World Cup (representing Japan): 2017, 2018 (winners)
Asian Games (representing Japan): 2018

Source:

References

External links

Japanese female golfers
LPGA of Japan Tour golfers
LPGA Tour golfers
Sportspeople from Kobe
2000 births
Living people
21st-century Japanese women